William Frame (31 August 1932 – 12 February 1965) was a New Zealand cricketer. He played seven first-class matches for Otago between 1955 and 1958.

Frame was born at Mosgiel in Otago in 1932 and educated at Otago Boys' High School in Dunedin. He worked as a fruiterer. A right-arm opening bowler, on his first-class debut against Canterbury in December 1955 he took five wickets in each innings.

In February 1965, Frame shot dead his girlfriend and her parents, before turning the gun on himself. He was a cousin of the New Zealand author Janet Frame.

References

External links
 

1932 births
1965 suicides
New Zealand cricketers
Otago cricketers
People from Mosgiel
Murder–suicides in New Zealand
Suicides by firearm in New Zealand
New Zealand murderers
1965 murders in New Zealand